John Arthur Antrobus (born 2 July 1933) is an English playwright and screenwriter. He has written extensively for stage, screen, TV and radio, including the epic World War II play, Crete and Sergeant Pepper at the Royal Court. He authored the children's book series Ronnie, which includes Help! I am a Prisoner in a Toothpaste Factory.

Early life
John Arthur Antrobus was born at Woolwich, London. His father was a regimental sergeant-major in the Royal Horse Artillery, and the family was stationed at the School of Artillery in Larkhill, on the edge of Salisbury Plain. After attending Bishop Wordsworth's School in Salisbury, Wiltshire, Selhurst Grammar School, Croydon, and King Edward VII Nautical College, London, where he was an apprentice deck officer in the Merchant Navy from 1950 to 1952, Antrobus attended the Royal Military Academy Sandhurst, serving with the East Surrey Regiment from 1952 to 1955, but rebelled and dropped out of the Army.

Career
After leaving the Army, spending time also working as a supply teacher and waiter, Antrobus pursued a future writing comedy, and went to Associated London Scripts (ALS), the writers' co-operative set up by Spike Milligan and Eric Sykes. Antrobus states "I met Spike in 1954 or 55. I had sent a sample script to Galton and Simpson and they took me on at Associated London Scripts". Antrobus and Milligan "wrote a couple of Goon Shows together. I wish I had done more of them with him but I wanted to be a playwright. I didn't realise they were golden times and how they gave life". The two shows were The Spon Plague, and The Great Statue Debate, both broadcast in March 1958.

At ALS, Antrobus also worked with Johnny Speight on The Frankie Howerd Show in 1956, After contributing material to the first Carry On film, Carry On Sergeant (1958), he wrote his first movie screenplay: for Idol on Parade (1959), starring Anthony Newley. During 1960 he worked with Milligan and Sykes in the second series of Sykes and A... (August- September 1960). He was also a contributing writer to the television series The Army Game, in the 1958 and 1961 shows, along with Larry Stephens, Maurice Wiltshire, and Lew Schwarz in 1958, and Brad Ashton, Barry Took, Marty Feldman and Wilshire in 1961. During the 1960s and 1970s, he provided scripts for television series as diverse as That Was the Week That Was, Television Playhouse and Spike Milligan's Milligan in...  Antrobus wrote for Milligan's last radio series, The Milligan Papers, a BBC Radio Collection released in 2002. Milligan said he did not actually like Antrobus.

Antrobus' best known play is the surrealist The Bed-Sitting Room (1963) (co-written with Milligan). A film version was released in 1969 and a sequel from 1983. His other plays include Cane of Honour (1965), Captain Oates' Left Sock (1969), An Apple A Day (1970) and City Delights (1978). In October 2005, Antrobus and Ray Galton (with whom he had collaborated on the 1986 sitcom Room at the Bottom and Get Well Soon from 1997) unveiled their play Steptoe and Son – Murder at Oil Drum Lane at the Theatre Royal, York. In 2010, Antrobus and Ray Galton's production of Not Tonight Caligula, originally written for Frankie Howerd, was recorded as a live radio play at The Leicester Square Theatre by The Wireless Theatre Company directed by Antrobus and starring Clive Greenwood in Howerd's role. Although largely retired, Antrobus still writes and is involved in fringe productions and talent scouting.

Personal life
In 1958, John Antrobus married Margaret  McCormick. They had two sons and a daughter.

Writing credits

Awards and nominations

Notes

Publications
  First produced Edinburgh, 1964.
  First produced Royal Court Theatre, London, 1968. Televised 1971.
  First produced, Almost Free, London, 1968
  First published in Great Britain by Margaret & Jack Hobbs, 1970. Published by Universal-Tandem Publishing Co Ltd, 1972.  1970 Spike Milligan and John Antrobus.
  First produced Royal Court Theatre, 1969
 
  First produced Gate Theatre, Notting Hill, London, 1980
  First produced Gate Theatre, Notting Hill, London, 1980
  First produced Gate Theatre, Notting Hill, London, 1980
 First produced, Mold, Clwyd, 1986.

External links 

1933 births
British television writers
British radio writers
Living people
Graduates of the Royal Military Academy Sandhurst
Writers from Aldershot
English comedy writers
British surrealist writers